Kirk Reid (born 1964 or 1965) is an English convicted rapist and serial sex offender.

Early life and career 

Kirk Reid was raised by his mother in Battersea, London, until the age of nine, and then spent time periodically in the care system. Reid has three brothers, some of whom are half-siblings; one of them was a Metropolitan Police constable at the time of Reid's arrest.

Reid made his living as a chef, and at the time of his arrest, he was head chef at Camberwell College. Reid's avocation was football, and he refereed and coached amateur matches in the Wimbledon district league and Battersea Park, sometimes for teams of children and women. Reid's criminal notoriety and work with children prompted the Football Association (FA) to issue the statement that "The FA would like to make it very clear that Kirk Reid was not a qualified FA youth football coach and did not undertake a mandatory FA CRB check."

At the time of his arrest in 2008, Reid lived in Cavendish Road, Balham, with his partner of five years, and owned a second property nearby.

Criminal history 

Police believe that Reid may have been responsible for more than 70 sexual assaults over a period of 23 years. Reid's pattern involved driving around South London districts—most frequently Tooting and Balham, close to where he lived—looking for women walking home alone. Waiting for them to be distracted or occupied, he would then attack them from behind. Reid's victims ranged in age from 28 to 61, and at least one woman was visibly pregnant.

At Reid's trial in 2009, a woman testified that Reid had raped her near his own home in Battersea in 1984. The woman was 17 years old, and did not report the rape to police at the time. Reid has not been charged with her rape. Another woman accused Reid of raping her in Balham in 1995. She reported the rape after his arrest in 2008, and Reid admitted having sex with her, but claimed it was consensual. That same year, Reid was accused and acquitted of indecent assault after a woman claimed he attacked her in an alley.

In 2002, police discovered links between 26 sexual assaults in the Wandsworth area of London dating back two years, and Reid was detained after a woman complained of being followed by him, but no further action was taken. In both 2004 and 2006, a car matching the description of Reid's red Volkswagen Golf was witnessed in connection with two separate sexual assaults, once via CCTV.

Arrest 

In 2008, the serious crime unit of the Metropolitan Police took over the investigation into the series of assaults, and within hours they named Reid as a suspect. Reid was arrested five days after a DNA test positively linked him to several attacks.

Once in custody, Reid's half-brother Roger, a police constable, visited his cell and asked him directly if he was guilty of the rapes. Reid replied, "I did it", a confession he later retracted.

Reid's uninterrupted crime spree, like that of another prolific serial rapist, the black cab driver John Worboys, was largely blamed on the failure of the police to successfully investigate sexual assaults, and led to procedural changes in the London Metropolitan Police's handling of rape and sexual assault crimes. John Yates, an assistant police commissioner at the time, stated that "Nothing can adequately excuse the failure to follow up straightforward lines of inquiry that should have seen Reid arrested" in 2004—four years before his actual arrest.

Conviction
In March 2009, Reid was convicted at Kingston upon Thames Crown Court of two rapes and 26 sexual assaults committed in southwest London from 1995–2007, for which he was sentenced to life imprisonment. The judge recommended that Reid serve at least seven-and-a-half years before being considered for release.

In January 2018, more than a year after Reid's recommended non-parole period had elapsed, the Parole Board announced that his case had come up for review "following the standard six-month process for all indeterminate sentence prisoners". In September 2018, Reid's request for release was denied, and the board ruled that he could request release again in 2020.

See also
List of serial rapists

References 

1960s births
Living people
2000s trials
20th-century English criminals
21st-century English criminals
British people convicted of sexual assault
Criminals from London
Date of birth missing (living people)
English chefs
English football managers
English male criminals
English people convicted of rape
English prisoners sentenced to life imprisonment
People from Balham
Place of birth missing (living people)
Prisoners sentenced to life imprisonment by England and Wales
Rape in London
Rape in the 1990s
Rape in the 2000s
Rape trials
Trials in London
Year of birth missing (living people)